The Ministry of Justice and Human Rights for Mali prepares and executes the national policy on justice, human rights, and the seals of the state. Other responsibilities include the following:

 Civil, criminal and commercial legislation
 Sentencing enforcement
 Administration of judicial and penitentiary services
 Overseeing statutes pertaining to the judiciary and legal and judicial professions
 Protecting human rights
 Aiding in the fight against terrorism, organized crime, human trafficking, corruption, and other forms of economic and financial crime

List of ministers (Post-1960 upon achieving independence) 
 Jean-Marie Kone (1960-1962)
 Mamadou Madeira Keita (1963-1968)
 Ibrahima Sall (1968-1969)
 Hamicire N'Doure (1969-1970)
 Joseph Mara (1972-1975)
 Mamadou Sanogo (1976-1979)
 Boubacar Sidibe (1979-1982)
 Issa Ongoiba (1982-1985)
 Django Sissoko (1985-1988)
 Oumar Ba (1988-1989)
 Mamdou Cissoko (1990)
 Samou Soumare (1991)
 Mamadou Ouattara (1991)
 Amadou Mody Diall (1992)
 Mag Koudissa Traore (1993)
 Hamidou Diabate (1993-1994)
 Boubacar Gaoussou Diarra (1994-1995)
 Cheickna Dettenha Kamissoko (1995-1997)
Hamidou Diabate (1997-2000)
 Abdoulaye Ogotembely Poudiougou (2000-2004)
 Fatoumata Sylla (2004-2007) [1st female]
 Maharafa Traore (2007-2012)
 Malik Coulibaly (2012-2013)
 Mohamed Aly Bathily (2013-2015)
 Mahamadou Diarra (2015-2016)
 Mamadou Ismaïla Konate (2016-2017)
 Hamidou Younoussa Maiga (2018)
 Mohamed Sidda Dicko (since October 2020)

See also 
 Justice ministry
 Politics of Mali

References 

Justice ministries
Government of Mali